Porter County is a county in the U.S. state of Indiana. As of 2020, the population was 173,215, making it the 10th most populous county in Indiana. The county seat is Valparaiso. The county is part of Northwest Indiana, as well as the Chicago metropolitan area. Porter County is the site of much of the Indiana Dunes, an area of ecological significance. The Hour Glass Museum in Ogden Dunes documents the region's ecological significance.

History
The Porter County area was occupied by an Algonquian people dubbed Huber-Berrien. This subsistence culture arrived after the glaciers retreated around 15,000 years ago and the rise of glacial Lake Algonquian, 4–8,000 years ago. The native people of this area were next recorded during the Iroquois Wars (1641–1701) as being Potawatomi and Miami. The trading post system used by the French and then the English encouraged native people to live in central villages along major waterways. Therefore, there are no recorded villages within Porter County's current boundaries. It was not until 1830 when Chiqua's town and Tassinong appear on maps and in records. Chiqua's town is a mile east of Valparaiso on State Route 2, the old Sauk Trail.

After the American Revolutionary War established US sovereignty over the territory of the upper midwest, the new federal government defined the Northwest Territory in 1787 which included the area of present-day Indiana. In 1800, Congress separated Ohio from the Northwest Territory, designating the rest of the land as the Indiana Territory. President Thomas Jefferson chose William Henry Harrison as the governor of the territory, and Vincennes was established as the capital. After the Michigan Territory was separated and the Illinois Territory was formed, Indiana was reduced to its current size and geography. By December 1816 the Indiana Territory was admitted to the Union as a state.

The Indiana State Legislature passed an omnibus county bill on 7 February 1835 that authorized the creation of thirteen counties in northeast Indiana, including Porter. In 1837 the county was organized. It was named for Capt. David Porter, naval officer during the Barbary Wars and the War of 1812.

In 1962, Bethlehem Steel built a large integrated steel mill on the shores of Lake Michigan, which is now owned and operated by Cleveland-Cliffs. The construction of the mill, as well as the neighboring Port of Indiana, generated enormous controversy between industrial interests and locals who wanted to conserve the natural shoreline and habitat. Although the activists lost and the steel mill and port were constructed, the US Congress created the Indiana Dunes National Lakeshore in 1966 to protect the area's unique natural habitat.

Geography
Porter County lies on the northern edge of Indiana; its north border is formed by Lake Michigan and its south border is formed by the westward-flowing Kankakee River Its once-tree-covered low rolling hills have been cleared and devoted to agriculture; the only exceptions in Porter County are the drainages carved into the terrain, which are brush-filled. The East Arm Little Calumet River flows westward through the upper portion of Porter County.

Adjacent counties

 LaPorte County - east
 Starke County - southeast
 Jasper County - south
 Lake County - west
 Cook County, Illinois - northwest, boundary in Lake Michigan
 Berrien County, Michigan - northeast, boundary in Lake Michigan

Protected areas
 Indiana Dunes National Park (part)
 Indiana Dunes National Park Heron Rookery
 Indiana Dunes State Park
 Moraine Nature Preserve

Major highways

  Interstate 80
   Indiana Toll Road
  Interstate 94
  U.S. Route 6
  U.S. Route 12
  U.S. Route 20
  U.S. Route 30
  U.S. Route 231
  State Road 2
  State Road 8
  State Road 49
  State Road 130
  State Road 149
  State Road 249
  State Road 520

Railroads

 Amtrak
 Canadian National
 Chesapeake and Indiana Railroad
 Chicago, Fort Wayne and Eastern Railroad
 Chicago South Shore and South Bend Railroad
 CSX Transportation
 Norfolk Southern Railway
 South Shore Line

Municipalities

The municipalities in Porter County and their populations as of the 2010 Census:

Cities
 Portage – 36,828
 Valparaiso – 31,730

Towns

 Beverly Shores – 613
 Burns Harbor – 1,156
 Chesterton – 13,068
 Dune Acres – 182
 Hebron – 3,724
 Kouts – 1,879
 Ogden Dunes – 1,110
 Porter – 4,858
 Town of Pines – 708

Census-designated places

 Aberdeen – 1,875
 Lakes of the Four Seasons – 3,097 (7,033 including portion in Lake County)
 Salt Creek Commons – 2,117
 Shorewood Forest – 2,708
 South Haven – 5,282
 Wheeler – 443

Unincorporated communities

 Aylesworth
 Babcock
 Beatrice
 Boone Grove
 Burdick
 Clanricarde
 Coburg
 Crocker
 Furnessville
 Hillcrest
 Hurlburt
 Malden
 Porter Crossroads
 Sedley
 Suman
 Tassinong
 Woodville

Townships
The 12 townships of Porter County and their populations as of the 2010 Census:

Education

Colleges and Universities
 Ivy Tech Community College
 Valparaiso University

Public School Districts
Public schools in Porter County are administered by several districts, most of which cover areas that roughly follow the county's township boundaries:

 Duneland School Corporation – Jackson, Liberty and Westchester townships
 East Porter County School Corporation – Morgan, Pleasant and Washington townships
 Metropolitan School District of Boone Township – Boone Township
 Michigan City Area Schools  – Pine Township
 Portage Township Schools – Portage Township
 Porter Township School Corporation – Porter Township
 Union Township School Corporation – Union Township
 Valparaiso Community Schools – Center Township

High Schools and Middle Schools

 Benjamin Franklin Middle School
 Boone Grove High School
 Boone Grove Middle School
 Chesterton High School
 Chesterton Middle School
 Hebron High School
 Hebron Middle School
 Kouts Middle-High School
 Morgan Township Middle/High School
 Portage High School
 Thomas Jefferson Middle School
 Union Township Middle School
 Valparaiso High School
 Washington Township Middle/High School
 Wheeler High School
 William Fegely Middle School
 Willowcreek Middle School

Elementary Schools

 Aylesworth Elementary School
 Bailly Elementary School
 Boone Grove Elementary School
 Brummitt Elementary School
 Central Elementary School (Portage)
 Central Elementary School (Valparaiso)
 Cooks Corners Elementary School
 Crisman Elementary School
 Flint Lake Elementary School
 Hayes Leonard Elementary School
 Hebron Elementary School
 Jackson Elementary School
 John Simatovich Elementary School
 Jones Elementary School
 Kouts Elementary School
 Kyle Elementary School
 Liberty Elementary School
 Liberty Intermediate School
 Memorial Elementary School
 Morgan Elementary School
 Myers Elementary School
 Northview Elementary School
 Parkview Elementary School
 Paul Saylor Elementary School
 Pine Elementary School
 Porter Lakes Elementary School
 South Haven Elementary School
 Thomas Jefferson Elementary School
 Union Center Elementary School
 Washington Township Elementary School
 Westchester Intermediate School
 Yost Elementary School

Public libraries
The county is served by two public library systems:
 Porter County Public Library has its main branch in Valparaiso with branches in Hebron, Kouts, Portage and South Haven.
 Westchester Public Library has its main branch, the Thomas Library, in Chesterton with a branch, the Hageman Library, in Porter.

Hospitals
 Porter Health Care System – 301 beds
 Portage Hospital – Portage
 Porter Regional Hospital – Valparaiso

Climate and weather

Government

The county government is a constitutional body, and is granted specific powers by the Constitution of Indiana and the Indiana Code.

County Council: The legislative branch of the county government; controls spending and revenue collection in the county. Representatives are elected to four-year terms from county districts. They set salaries, the annual budget and special spending. The council has limited authority to impose local taxes, in the form of an income and property tax that is subject to state level approval, excise taxes and service taxes.

Board of Commissioners: The executive body of the county; commissioners are elected county-wide, to staggered four-year terms. One commissioner serves as president. The commissioners execute acts legislated by the council, collect revenue and manage the county government.

Court: The county maintains a small claims court that handles civil cases. The judge on the court is elected to a term of four years and must be a member of the Indiana Bar Association. The judge is assisted by a constable who is also elected to a four-year term. In some cases, court decisions can be appealed to the state level circuit court.

County Officials: The county has other elected offices, including sheriff, coroner, auditor, treasurer, recorder, surveyor, and circuit court clerk. These officials are elected to four-year terms. Members elected to county government positions are required to declare party affiliations and to be residents of the county.

Porter County is part of Indiana's 1st congressional district. In state government, Porter County is in Indiana Senate districts 4th, 5th and 6th; in Indiana House of Representatives districts 3rd, 4th, 10th, 19th and 20th.

For most of its history, Porter County was a Republican Party stronghold in presidential elections. It has become a swing county in recent years, voting for the national winner in every presidential election since 1980 except for 1992 and 2020.

County elected officials

Board of Commissioners: 
 Jim Biggs (R, North District)
 Jeff Good (R, Center District)
 Laura Shurr Blaney (D, South District)

County Council: 
 Mike Jessen, President (R, 4th)
 Dan L. Whitten, Vice President (D, At Large)
 Sylvia Graham (D, At Large)
 Jeff Larson (R, At Large)
 Andy Bozak (R, 1st)
 Jeremy Rivas (D, 2nd)
 Karen Conover (R, 3rd)

Elected Officials:
 Assessor: Jon M. Snyder (R)
 Auditor: Vicki Urbanik (D)
 Clerk: Karen M. Martin (R)
 Coroner: Chuck Harris (R)
 Prosecutor: Brian T. Gensel (R)
 Recorder: Jon C. Miller (R)
 Sheriff: David M. Reynolds (D)
 Surveyor: Kevin D. Breitzke (D)
 Treasurer: Michelle Clancy (D)

Demographics

2010 Census
As of the 2010 United States Census, there were 164,343 people, 61,998 households, and 43,901 families in the county. The racial makeup of the county was 91.3% white, 3.0% black or African American, 1.2% Asian, 0.3% American Indian, 2.3% from other races, and 1.9% from two or more races. Those of Hispanic or Latino origin made up 8.5% of the population. In terms of ancestry, 29.1% were German, 18.5% were Irish, 10.1% were Polish, 9.7% were English, 5.8% were Italian, and 5.6% were American.

Of the 61,998 households, 34.1% had children under the age of 18 living with them, 55.7% were married couples living together, 10.4% had a female householder with no husband present, 29.2% were non-families, and 23.3% of all households were made up of individuals. The average household size was 2.60 and the average family size was 3.07. The median age was 38.4 years.

The median income for a household in the county was $47,697 and the median income for a family was $73,065. Males had a median income of $59,542 versus $35,534 for females. The per capita income for the county was $27,922. About 6.6% of families and 9.4% of the population were below the poverty line, including 12.8% of those under age 18 and 5.2% of those age 65 or over.

Porter County Cemeteries

Maplewood Cemetery, next to Graceland in Valparaiso, has burials from the 1700s. The Bailly Cemetery was started in 1827. Additional cemeteries were created as the population grew. Early cemeteries were often family owned or church related. As communities grew, community cemeteries developed. The newest cemetery in the county is Angel Crest Cemetery north of Valparaiso, near Indiana State Road 49.

Porter County Parks
Porter County has grown from a single park, Sunset Hill Farm County Park, to four, including: Calumet Trail, Dunn's Bridge County Park, and the newest, Brincka Cross Gardens.
 Brincka Cross Gardens Pine Township
 Calumet Trail ( long), parallel to U.S. 12, at the north end of the county. A mixed use trail for walking, running, biking and cross-country skiing.
 Dunn's Bridge County Park on the southern boundary of the county on County Road 500 East, Dunn's Bridge spans the Kankakee River to Jasper county. It is one of the oldest landmarks in the region. Built over a century ago across the Kankakee River by a resident farmer named Dunn, legend suggests its origins may be traced to the famous George Ferris, creator of the first 'Ferris Wheel'. The park provides small boat access to the Kankakee River and a parking lot.
 Sunset Hill Farm County Park. Built around the Col. Murray farm, the open meadows are used for festivals and events.

Cultural Activities

Museums
 Alton Goin Museum is operated by the Portage Community Historical Society at Countryside Park in Portage to preserve the city's history, including the Trager farmhouse.
 Bailly Homestead & Chellberg Farm is part of Indiana Dunes National Park.
 Brauer Museum of Art is operated by Valparaiso University and is located in Valparaiso University Center for the Arts. It has the largest collection of works by Junius R. Sloan.
 Depot of Beverly Shores Museum & Art Gallery is a pink stucco museum to preserve Beverly Shores history through rotating exhibits of paintings, drawings, sculpture, ceramics and woodcarving.
 Hour Glass House Museum has the works of local artists.
 Porter County Museum of History maintains the history of Porter County.
 Stagecoach Inn & Panhandle Depot is operated by the Hebron Historical Society in Hebron.
 Westchester Township History Museum is operated by the Westchester Public Library and is located in the George Brown Mansion, the former home of a wealthy family that exhibits local history of the Indiana Dunes.
 Task Force Tips Fire Museum is operated by Task Force Tips in Valparaiso to preserve the history of fire equipment.

Live Theater
 4th Street Theater is a community theater in Chesterton.
 Chicago Street Theatre is a community theater in Valparaiso.
 Front Porch Music is a music supply store that offers a weekly 'open mic' night and sponsors concerts in Valparaiso.
 Memorial Opera House presents live theater and a variety of other monthly programs.
 Valparaiso Theatrical Company travels to different venues in Porter County presenting live theater with the proceeds benefitting a variety of charities.
 Valparaiso University Center for the Arts is the Valparaiso University's performing arts center.

See also
 National Register of Historic Places listings in Porter County, Indiana

Bibliography

Notes

References

External links
 Official Porter County website
 Porter County GenWeb – county history and genealogy website
 Porter County Municipal Airport (VPZ)
 Center Township Trustee Website (Information about township assistance for those experiencing financial difficulties.)

 
Indiana counties
Northwest Indiana
1836 establishments in Indiana
Populated places established in 1836
Chicago metropolitan area